The yatagan, yataghan or ataghan (from Turkish yatağan), also called varsak, is a type of Ottoman knife or short sabre used from the mid-16th to late 19th centuries.
The yatagan was extensively used in Ottoman Turkey and in areas under immediate Ottoman influence, such as the Balkans and the Caucasus.

Description
The yatagan consists of a single-edged blade with a marked forward curve and a hilt formed of two grip plaques attached through the tang, the end of the hilt being shaped like large ears. The gap between the grips is covered by a metal strap, which is often decorated. This blade form is often referred to as being 'recurved'. While the back of the blade is made of softer steel, the sharp edge is made of hard, tempered steel for durability.

The yatagans (also called varsak, named after Varsak Turkomans) used by janissaries and other infantry soldiers were smaller and lighter than ordinary swords so as not to hinder them when carried at the waist on the march.

The town of Yatağan in southwest Turkey (now in Denizli province) was famous for its yataghan smithing and in folklore is considered to be the birthplace of yataghans.

The hilt has no guard; 'bolsters' of metal connect the grips to the shoulder of the blade. The grip plaques are typically made from bone, ivory, horn or silver, and spread out in two 'wings' or 'ears' to either side at the pommel (a feature which prevents the hilt slipping out of the hand when used to cut). Regional variations in the hilts have been noted: Balkan yatagans tend to have larger ears and are often of bone or ivory, whilst Anatolian yatagans characteristically have smaller ears which are more often made of horn or silver, while Ionian coast Zeibeks carried T-Hilt Yataghans. Sophisticated artwork on both the hilt and the blade can be seen on many yatagans displayed today, indicating considerable symbolic value. Having no guard, the yatagan fitted closely into the top of the scabbard; this was customarily worn thrust into a waist sash, retained by hook. The blade may have the Seal of Solomon motif pressed into the blade. Other popular imprints include the makers signature symbol, or text from the Quran.

The majority of yatagans date from the period 1750–1860, and from the number of plain, wooden-hilted weapons they were honest fighting weapons as well as ornate parade weapons. The more ornate examples were often worn as a status symbol by civilians, as well as military men, much in the way smallswords were worn in 18th century Western Europe.

Occasionally blades were cut down from broadswords or cavalry swords, but in general the forward-curving single-edged blade was used. Verses in gold or silver are often laid along the blade. Silver hilts mounted with filigree and coral, for example, are associated with Turkish Yataghans; many of these are dated around 1800, although it wasn't uncommon for the blades to be dated much earlier. The most flamboyant scabbards are of wood, encased entirely with silver.

By contrast, in the later half of the 1800s, the prevalence of sword bayonets on military rifles gave rise to an entire style of mass-produced military bayonets known as "Yataghan style".

According to legend, the town was conquered by a Seljuk commander and blacksmith named Osman Bey, whose cognomen was Yatağan Baba (Father Yataghan). Yatağan Baba later settled there and invented the yataghan type blades, and gave his name not only to the town, but to the weapon he invented and produced there.

See also
Kukri
Shashka
Scimitar

References

External links
 

Blade weapons
Middle Eastern swords
Military equipment of the Ottoman Empire
Turkish words and phrases
Turkish inventions
Weapons of the Ottoman Empire